Shelley's starling (Lamprotornis shelleyi) is a species of starling in the family Sturnidae. It is found in East Africa, within the borders of Ethiopia, Kenya, Somalia, Somaliland, South Sudan, and Tanzania.

The common name and Latin binomial commemorate George Ernest Shelley, an English ornithologist and nephew of poet Percy Bysshe Shelley.

References

Shelley's starling
Birds of the Horn of Africa
Shelley's starling
Taxonomy articles created by Polbot